Tropical Storm Kirsten was the eighth tropical cyclone of the 1966 Pacific hurricane season and the second to make landfall in the Baja California peninsula. Forming north of the Intertropical Convergence Zone (ITCZ), Kirsten developed into a tropical depression on September 25 and like Tropical Storm Joyce of the same season, took a long period of time before intensifying into a tropical storm.

Tropical Storm Kirsten had caused much damage and was the costliest storm of the season, in front of Hurricane Adele, which had previously affected the Baja California peninsula before. 8 people had died due to flooding and winds caused by Kirsten.

Meteorological history 
6 days after Joyce's dissipation, a tropical depression formed north of the Intertropical Convergence Zone on the evening of August 25. The storm was then named Tropical Depression  Sixteen-EIt took an extended amount of time, about 3 days before it intensified into a tropical storm. The storm was designated as Tropical Storm Kirsten.

After it was upgraded, Kirsten swept the Baja California Peninsula, mainly Baja California Sur. Kirsten made landfall again about halfway between Los Mochis and Ciudad Obregón, Mexico. Kirsten weakened, but maintained tropical storm status before making landfall in Sinaloa. While making landfall, Kirsten made extensive damage in the peninsula. The winds of Kirsten were up to  while making landfall. 8 people died from Kirsten's waves. Kirsten degenerated into a remnant low on September 28 and dissipated on September 29 near Navojoa.

Impact 
Tropical Storm Kirsten was the second storm to impact Mexico and the costliest tropical cyclone to impact Mexico that year, doing more than $5.6 million in 1966 USD which is 44.1 million in 2019 USD. 8 people had died from drowning, but there were no reports of flooding.

Flooding and strong winds destroyed more than 1000 homes. After the storm dissipated, the Mexican Defense Ministry gave provided food, medical supplies, and temporary shelter to the victims of Kirsten, mainly in Sinaloa and Sonora. The storm was the deadliest tropical cyclone that year, with only 1 death from that hurricane season from another tropical cyclone.

See also 

 1966 Pacific hurricane season
 Tropical Storm Lorraine (1966) — would later strike the same area days later
 Tropical Storm Maggie (1966) — would later strike the same area a week later
 Hurricane Kirsten — other uses

References

External links 
 Joint Typhoon Warning Center (JTWC)
 National Oceanic and Atmospheric Administration (NOAA)
 National Hurricane Center/National Weather Service (NHC/NWS)

1966 Pacific hurricane season
Tropical cyclones in 1966
1966 in Mexico